Anconia is a genus of band-winged grasshoppers in the family Acrididae. There are at least two described species in Anconia.

Species
These two species belong to the genus Anconia:
 Anconia hebardi Rehn, 1919 (Hebard's blue-winged desert grasshopper)
 Anconia integra Scudder, 1876 (alkali grasshopper)

References

Further reading

 
 

Oedipodinae
Articles created by Qbugbot